Karpen House is a historic home located at Lloyd Harbor in Suffolk County, New York. It was built in 1955 and is a long, low residence surmounted by a flat roof with overhanging eaves.  It represents a vernacular interpretation of the Modern style.

It was added to the National Register of Historic Places in 2006.

References

Houses on the National Register of Historic Places in New York (state)
Houses completed in 1955
Houses in Suffolk County, New York
National Register of Historic Places in Suffolk County, New York
1955 establishments in New York (state)